Paratropes fossilis is an extinct species of cockroach within the family Ectobiidae that lived during the Cretaceous period. The holotype is an isolated right tegmen 24 millimeters in length. The type locality is in the Gerofit Locality within the Ora Formation located in Israel.

References 

Fossil taxa described in 2008
Cretaceous insects
Fossils of Israel
Cockroaches
Cretaceous insects of Asia
Late Cretaceous first appearances
Late Cretaceous extinctions
Insects described in 2008